The Monte Ahuja College of Business is a business school located in Cleveland State University in Cleveland, Ohio. With more than 3,000 current students and over 19,000 alumni, the Monte Ahuja College of Business ranks among the largest in Ohio.  It is fully accredited by the AACSB, and currently offers the Bachelor of Business Administration (BBA) undergraduate degree with a number of majors and minors. It also offers six graduate degree programs, one dual graduate degree program, and one doctoral degree program.

Location
Monte Ahuja College of Business is located in Downtown Cleveland. It is bounded on the East 18th Street of Euclid Avenue and Chester Avenue.

History

The Monte Ahuja College of Business was first formed as the Nance College of Business, named for James J. Nance, a Cleveland industrialist who served as the university's first chairman of the board of trustees. At the onset, it was an applied vocational school, and was housed in World War II-era Quonset huts, without any permanent building on campus.

In 1970, the college was renamed to the James J. Nance College of Business Administration. In 2011, it was again renamed, to the Monte Ahuja College of Business, after former CSU Board of Trustees Chair, Monte Ahuja. Ahuja had donated $10 million to the school, the largest donation in the University’s 47-year history.

Programs and majors

Undergraduate majors

BBA
Accounting 
Business Economics
Finance 
Human Resources Management
Information Systems 
International Business 
Management 
Marketing 
Operations And Supply Chain Management
Property Management

Bachelor of Science
Health Care Management
Bachelor of Arts
Economics
Sport and Entertainment Management

Graduate programs
Master of Accountancy (MACC)
MBA, Master of Business Administration (Various Specializations Offered)
EMBA, Executive Master of Business Administration
Online Accelerated MBA (OAMBA) - 100% Online
Master of Information Systems (MIS)
Master of Health Care Management - 100% Online
Master of Labor Relations/Human Resources (MLRHR) - 100% Online
MBA/Juris Doctor (JD/MBA) 
Doctor of Business Administration (DBA)

Global Business Center
The Global Business Center was created to conduct education and training programs in global business.

Honors
The college was honored on June 21, 2006 with the Ohio Governor's Excellence in Exporting Award, presented by then-Governor Bob Taft.

References

External links

 [This is for the previous name of the college; the website was apparently closed down after the 2011 renaming.]

Business schools in Ohio
Cleveland State University